Soubré is a city in southwestern Ivory Coast. It is a sub-prefecture of and the seat of Soubré Department. It is also a commune and the seat of Nawa Region in Bas-Sassandra District. In the 2014 census, the city had a population of 101,196 and the sub-prefecture a population of 175,163.

Villages
The twenty two villages of the sub-prefecture of Soubré and their population in 2014 are:

Climate 
Köppen-Geiger climate classification system classifies its climate as tropical savanna (Aw).

References 

Sub-prefectures of Nawa Region
Communes of Nawa Region
Regional capitals of Ivory Coast